Halifax Citadel-Sable Island is a provincial electoral district in Halifax, Nova Scotia, Canada, that elects one member of the Nova Scotia House of Assembly.

Its current Member of the Legislative Assembly is Lisa Lachance of the Nova Scotia New Democratic Party.

The constituency consists of the downtown city centre of Halifax and the residential South End.  The regional district's area includes four universities (including Dalhousie University and Saint Mary's University) and four hospitals. The constituency also includes Sable Island. The remaining area of South End, Halifax is 7 km2, and Sable Island is 31 km2.

Statistics
Population (2016): 22,106

Halifax Citadel: 

Sable Island: 

Halifax Citadel Population Density: 3,158/km2

History
From 1978 to 1997, a Progressive Conservative seat, Halifax Citadel has since become a major battleground between all three major parties. The seat changed hands in each of the five elections between the 1997 by-election and the 2006 general election and has been won by each major party within the last four elections.

In 1993, the name of the riding was changed from Halifax Cornwallis to Halifax Citadel.

On October 7, 2005, following the resignation of Liberal member Danny Graham, the seat became vacant. A by-election was called for June 27, 2006. That then became void when the 2006 general election was called for June 13, 2006.

In what was one of the most watched ridings during the 2006 provincial election, NDP candidate Leonard Preyra came out in front of former Progressive Conservative leadership candidate Bill Black.
 
On May 27, 2008, the name of the riding was changed from Halifax Citadel to Halifax Citadel-Sable Island.

Members of the Legislative Assembly
This riding has elected the following Members of the Legislative Assembly:

Election results

1967 general election

1970 general election

1974 general election

1978 general election

1981 general election

1984 general election

1988 general election

1993 general election

1997 by-election

1998 general election

1999 general election

2003 general election

2006 general election

2009 general election

2013 general election 

|-
 
|Liberal
|Labi Kousoulis
|align="right"|2,966
|align="right"|47.66
|align="right"| 
|-
 
|New Democratic Party
|Leonard Preyra
|align="right"|1,934
|align="right"|31.08
|align="right"| 
|-
 
|Progressive Conservative
|Andrew Black
|align="right"|1,094
|align="right"|17.58 
|align="right"| 
|-

|-

|Independent (Atlantica)
|Frederic Boileau-Cadieux
|align="right"|31
|align="right"|0.50
|align="right"| 
|}

Data from Electoral History for Halifax Citadel-Sable Island

References

External links 
CBC riding profile for 2006 General Election
2006 Nova Scotia Provincial General Election Poll by Poll Results
1999 Poll by Poll Results
1998 Poll by Poll Results
1997 By-Election Poll by Poll Results
1993 Poll by Poll Results
1988 Poll by Poll Results
1984 Poll by Poll Results
1981 Poll by Poll Results
1978 Poll by Poll Results
1974 Poll by Poll Results
1970 Poll by Poll Results
 1967 Poll by Poll Results

Nova Scotia provincial electoral districts
Politics of Halifax, Nova Scotia